Ayelet may refer to:

People
Ayelet Gundar-Goshen, Israeli author
Ayelet the Kosher Komic, Orthodox Jewish female stand-up comedian
Ayelet Menahemi, Israeli film director, producer, writer, editor, and actor
Ayelet Ohayon (born 1974), Israeli European champion foil fencer
Ayelet Shachar (born 1966), legal scholar
Ayelet Shaked, Israeli politician
Ayelet Waldman, Israeli-American novelist and essayist
Ayelet Zurer, Israeli actress

Places
Ayelet HaShahar, kibbutz in northern Israel